Christine Lee Yuk-guen is a Hong Kong actress. She won the Hong Kong Film Award for Best New Performer in 1987 for her role in Just Like Weather, starring opposite Chan Hung-nin as a wife on the verge of divorce with her husband over her opposition to his desire to emigrate to the United States.

References

Living people
Year of birth missing (living people)
Hong Kong film actresses
20th-century Hong Kong actresses